Evelyn E. Smith (25 July 1922 – 4 July 2000) was an American writer of science fiction and mysteries, as well as a compiler of crossword puzzles.

Profile
During the 1950s, under her own name, Smith regularly published short stories and novelettes in such publications as Galaxy Science Fiction, Fantastic Universe and the prestigious The Magazine of Fantasy & Science Fiction. Her short fiction ranges from satires set in a post-apocalyptic setting such as "The Last of the Spode" and "The Hardest Bargain", to "BAXBR/DAXBR", where she explores the dangers of Martian crossword puzzles. Her science fiction novels chiefly deal with questions of gender identity and, like all of her work, are characterized by their wit and humor.

Smith is probably best known, however, for her Miss Melville Mystery series, which chronicles the exploits of a middle-aged socialite-turned-assassin.

Under the pseudonym of Delphine C. Lyons, she authored a number of gothic romance novels and the non-fiction works Everyday Witchcraft and Love Potions & Spells, which collect folklore and magical spells, and Fortune Telling, eight ways to read the future.

Smith's short story "At Last I've Found You" was adapted into an opera by Seymour Barab; it premiered in Charlotte, North Carolina in 1984.

Works

Novels
 The Perfect Planet (1962)
 Unpopular Planet (1975)
 The Copy Shop (1985)

Short stories
 "Tea Tray in the Sky" (1952)
 "The Martian and the Magician" (1952)
 "Not Fit for Children" (1953)
 "The Last of the Spode" (1953) [also as by Evelyn Smith ]
 "Nightmare on the Nose" (1953)
 "BAXBR/DAXBR" (1954) also appeared as:
 "Call Me Wizard" (1954)
 "Gerda" (1954)
 "The Agony of the Leaves" (1954)
 "At Last I've Found You" (1954)
 "Collector's Item" (1954)
 "The Laminated Woman" (1954)
 "The Vilbar Party" (1955)
 "Dragon Lady" (1955)
 "Helpfully Yours" (1955)
 "The Big Jump" (1955)
 "Man's Best Friend" (1955)
 "The Princess and the Physicist" (1955)
 "The Faithful Friend" (1955)
 "Teragram" (1955)
 "The Good Husband" (1955)
 "The Doorway" (1955)
 "Jack of No Trades" (1955)
 "Weather Prediction" (1955)
 "Floyd and the Eumenides" (1955)
 "Bodyguard" (1956)
 "The Captain's Mate" (1956)
 "The Venus Trap" (1956)
 "Mr. Replogle's Dream" (1956)
 "Woman's Touch" (1957)
 "The Ignoble Savages" (1957)
 "The Lady from Aldebaran" (1957)
 "Once a Greech" (1957)
 "Outcast of Mars" (1957)
 "The 4D Bargain" (1957)
 "The Hardest Bargain" (1957)
 "The Man Outside" (1957)
 "The Most Sentimental Man" (1957)
 "The Weegil" (1957)
 "The Blue Tower" (1958)
 "My Fair Planet" (1958)
 "Never Come Midnight" (1958)
 "Two Suns of Morcali" (1958) (variant title: "The Two Suns of Morcali")
 "The People Upstairs" (1959)
 "The Alternate Host" (1959)
 "Someone To Watch Over Me" (1959)
 "Send Her Victorious" (1960)
 "A Day in the Suburbs" (1960)
 "Sentry of the Sky" (1961)
 "Softly While You're Sleeping" (1961)
 "Robert E. Lee at Moscow" (1961)
 "They Also Serve" (1962)
 "Little Gregory" (1964)
 "Calliope and Gherkin and the Yankee Doodle Thing" (1969)

Miss Melville mysteries
 Miss Melville Regrets (1986)
 Miss Melville Returns (1988)
 Miss Melville's Revenge (1990)
 Miss Melville Rides a Tiger (1991)
 Miss Melville Rejoices (1991)

Other novels (as Delphine C. Lyons)
 Flowers of Evil (1965)
 House of Four Windows (1965)
 The Depths of Yesterday (1966)
 Valley of Shadows (1968)
 Phantom at Lost Lake (1970)

Nonfiction (as Delphine C. Lyons)
 Everyday Witchcraft (1972)
 Love Potions & Spells (1980)
 Fortune Telling (1980)

Short story collections
 Evelyn E. Smith Resurrected: Selected Stories of Evelyn E. Smith (2010)
 The Two Suns of Morcali and Other Stories (2012)
 An Evelyn E. Smith Omnibus (2020)

See also

References

External links
 
  
 
 
 Episode 3 of the podcast Buxom Blondes with Ray Guns (Hannah Wolfe, 10 February 2018) features two 1955 stories by Evelyn E. Smith.

1922 births
2000 deaths
Women science fiction and fantasy writers
20th-century American women writers
20th-century American novelists
American women novelists
American women short story writers
American romantic fiction novelists
Women romantic fiction writers
Novelists from New York (state)
Crossword compilers
20th-century short story writers